, better known by the stage name , is a Japanese tarento, actress, singer and gravure idol. She was raised in Kurashiki, Okayama, but was born in Matsue, Shimane. She is currently affiliated with Suns Entertainment. She dropped out of Kurashiki Suishō Senior High School (at the time an all-girls school).

Personal life
In July 2008, after discovering she was pregnant, Megumi married Dragon Ash lead singer Kenji Furuya, whom she had been dating since 2005.

On February 6, 2009, Megumi gave birth to their first child, a son, who weighed in at 3 kg.

Roles

Variety shows
Aa! Hanano Ryōrinin (March 20, 2008, Nippon TV)
Africa no Tsume (Nippon Television)
Akashiya Santa no Shijōsaidai no Christmas Present Show (2001)
Bachikoi! (Setonaikai Broadcasting Corporation)
Blog Type (April–September 2005, Fuji TV)
The God of Entertainment (Nippon Television)
Gaki no Tsukai ya Arahende (Nippon Television)
Ken Shimura's Baka Tonosama (Fuji TV)
Hashire! Gulliver-kun (Kansai Telecasting Corporation)
Hey! Spring of Trivia (Fuji TV)
Tora no Mon (TV Asahi)
Zenkoku Issei! Nihonjin Test (April 2008, Fuji TV)

Educational Television
Onishi Hiroto's Basic English Recipe （April 2022, NHK Educational TV)

Radio
MEGUMI-X (FM-FUJI)
MEGUMI no MAKE ME HAPPY! (April–September 2005, Nippon Broadcasting System)

Commercials
Asahi Breweries (2007)
GyaO
Japan Racing Association (2006)
Morinaga & Company Weider in Jelly "Diet Weider"
Nestle Japan Nescafe Santa Marta
Okayama Prefecture
Okayama Prefecture police (Improvement of traffic manners campaign)
Rohto Pharmaceutical Co. FamilyMart Natural Cycle
Sapporo Brewery
Yellow Hat

Film
Hero (2007), Sakurako Kōno
SS (2008), Girako
The Blood of Wolves (2018)
Little Nights, Little Love (2018)
Neet Neet Neet (2018)
The Stormy Family (2019)
One Night (2019)
Stigmatized Properties (2020), Kaori
The Way of the Househusband (2022), Kazuko Tanaka
What to Do with the Dead Kaiju? (2022), the Minister of Health, Labour and Welfare
Mado (2022)
The Last 10 Years (2022)
Downfall (2023), Nozomi Machida
Scroll (2023)
December (2023)
Insomniacs After School (2023), Isaki's mother

TV drama
 Ossan's Love: In the Sky (2019), Haruka Neko
 The Way of the Househusband (2020), Kazuko Tanaka
 The Naked Director Season 2 (2021)
 A Day-Off of Ryunosuke Kamiki (2022)
 Ōoku: The Inner Chambers (2023), Ōoka Tadasuke

Books

Photoalbums
Gekkan MEGUMI (Shinchosha)
Megami (Gakken)
meg (Aqua House)

See also
Kenji Furuya (Dragon Ash) (husband)
Ikkō Furuya (father-in-law)

Awards and nominations

References

External links
Suns Entertainment
Yahoo fan club
Geneon Entertainment

1981 births
Japanese gravure idols
Japanese television personalities
Japanese women pop singers
Japanese film actresses
Japanese television actresses
Japanese voice actresses
Living people
People from Kurashiki
21st-century Japanese actresses
21st-century Japanese women singers
21st-century Japanese singers